Santosh Chowdhary (born 5 October 1944) is an Indian Politician belonging to the Indian National Congress. She was elected to the Lok Sabha, lower house of the Parliament of India from the Hoshiarpur constituency in 2009. She was earlier elected from the Phillaur constituency Punjab in 1992 and 1999. She was the Chairperson of the National Commission for Safai Karamcharis.

References

External links
Official biographical sketch in Parliament of India website

Indian National Congress politicians from Punjab, India
Living people
1944 births
India MPs 2009–2014
India MPs 1999–2004
India MPs 1991–1996
People from Solan district
Women in Punjab, India politics
Lok Sabha members from Punjab, India
20th-century Indian women politicians
20th-century Indian politicians
21st-century Indian women politicians
21st-century Indian politicians
People from Hoshiarpur district
People from Jalandhar district